Trempealeau, Wisconsin may refer to:

 Trempealeau (town), Wisconsin, a town in the U.S. state of Wisconsin
 Trempealeau (village), Wisconsin, a village  in the U.S. state of Wisconsin
 Trempealeau County, Wisconsin, a county in the US state of Wisconsin

See also
 Trempealeau Morninglight (2001–2016), American skier